Guntaseema is a village in Alluri Sitharama Raju district, Andhra Pradesh, India with a population of about 3,000. 
This village belongs to the Mandal of Dumbriguda, with a pincode of 531151.

Villages in  Alluri Sitharama Raju district